Scoparia sideraspis is a species of moth in the family Crambidae. It was described by Edward Meyrick in 1905. This species is endemic to New Zealand.

The wingspan is 25–28 mm.

References

Moths described in 1905
Moths of New Zealand
Scorparia
Endemic fauna of New Zealand
Taxa named by Edward Meyrick
Endemic moths of New Zealand